Federico Mistrangelo (born 11 May 1981) is an Italian water polo player who competed in the 2008 Summer Olympics.

References

1981 births
Living people
Italian male water polo players
Olympic water polo players of Italy
Water polo players at the 2008 Summer Olympics
Water polo players from Genoa